The 1977 Toronto Blue Jays season was the first season of Major League Baseball played by the Toronto-based expansion franchise. The Blue Jays finished seventh in the American League East with a record of 54 wins and 107 losses, 45½ games behind the World Champion New York Yankees.

Offseason 
 October 21, 1976: The Blue Jays traded a player to be named later to the Chicago White Sox for Phil Roof. The Blue Jays completed the deal by sending Larry Anderson to the White Sox on January 5, 1977.
 November 5, 1976: 1976 Major League Baseball expansion draft
Rico Carty was drafted by the Blue Jays from the Cleveland Indians with the 10th pick.
Jim Mason was drafted by the Blue Jays from the New York Yankees with the 30th pick.
 November 5, 1976: Al Fitzmorris was traded by the Blue Jays to the Cleveland Indians for Alan Ashby and Doug Howard.
 November 5, 1976: Chuck Hartenstein was purchased by the Blue Jays from the San Diego Padres.
 December 6, 1976: Rico Carty was traded by the Blue Jays to the Cleveland Indians for Rick Cerone and John Lowenstein.
 February 17, 1977: Dave Roberts was traded by the Blue Jays to the San Diego Padres for Jerry Johnson.
 February 24, 1977: Mike Weathers (minors) was traded by the Blue Jays to the Oakland Athletics for Ron Fairly.
 March 29, 1977: John Lowenstein was traded by the Blue Jays to the Cleveland Indians for Héctor Torres.

Spring training 
The team had announced on August 26, 1976 that they had selected Dunedin, Florida as its base for spring training. Dunedin was a 30-minute drive from the Tampa airport with daily flights to and from Toronto, and was near other spring training sites including the Philadelphia Phillies in Clearwater, the New York Mets and St. Louis Cardinals in St. Petersburg, the Cincinnati Reds in Tampa, and the Pittsburgh Pirates in Bradenton. 

Dunedin's Grant Field was located near the downtown and had been used in the 1950s and 1960s by AAA minor league clubs for spring training. The city improved the ballpark with new seats, fences, and clubhouses, increasing seating from approximately 1,200 to 2,000. 

The Blue Jays' first exhibition game was scheduled for March 10, 1977 against the Philadelphia Phillies, but was cancelled due to rain. Instead, the first game was March 11, 1977 against the New York Mets. Wire services reported, "Spectators who arrived too late to purchase tickets inhabited areas down the foul lines, outside the outfield fences and some even took seats in the Babe Ruth League grandstand located down right field line, some 500 feet away from home plate." Bill Singer started the game for the Blue Jays and surrendered a lead off home run to the Mets' Lee Mazzilli. The Blue Jays came back and won 3-1 in front of 1,988 fans.

The first two times that they played the Montreal Expos, the Jays were triumphant as well. Perhaps the highlight of spring training was a game against the Cincinnati Reds. The Blue Jays defeated the defending World Series champions with the Reds missing only one regular starter from their lineup. After spring training, the Blue Jays 25-man roster was set. Ron Fairly, who had previously played for the Montreal Expos, was one of the most recognizable players on the nascent team. The only marquee name was Bill Singer, a pitcher who won 20 games with the Los Angeles Dodgers in 1969 and threw a no-hitter in 1970. Pat Gillick had worked out a deal with the New York Yankees to trade Singer for promising young left-hander Ron Guidry. Blue Jays president Peter Bavasi vetoed the deal, as Singer was part of his plan to market and promote the team.

Regular season

The first game 

On April 7, 1977, 44,649 fans attended the first game in Toronto Blue Jays franchise history, as the squad hosted the Chicago White Sox. Notables in attendance that day included Metro Toronto chairman Paul Godfrey, Toronto mayor David Crombie, legendary NHL broadcaster Foster Hewitt, and country singer Anne Murray. Besides the snow that adorned the field, hundreds of fans missed the first pitch because they were stuck in traffic. An enduring image was the Chicago catcher using his shin pads to ski on the field with bats used as poles before the game started.

The umpires for the game included crew chief Nestor Chylak, Joe Brinkman, Rich Garcia, and 27-year-old Steve Palermo, who was making his major-league debut. The game was broadcast on the CBC with Tom McKee (host), Don Chevrier (play-by-play) and New York Yankee legend Whitey Ford providing the commentary. McKee was the first-ever face, and voice, to appear on the inaugural Blue Jays telecast. The Blue Jays would appear on the CBC only 16 times that first season. Tom Cheek and analyst Early Wynn called the game on the radio, this being the first of 4,306 consecutive games that Cheek would call.

As the snow was squeegeed off the field (via a Zamboni on loan from the Toronto Maple Leafs), the 48th Highlanders marched onto the field to perform the Star Spangled Banner. Canadian country star Murray, wearing a red parka, then sang O Canada.

The fans chanted "We want beer," because Toronto's Exhibition Stadium was the only ballpark in the major leagues to not serve beer. This was essentially a political protest, since all Ontarian stadia were forbidden by law at the time from selling alcoholic beverages. It would take more than five years of lobbying and petitioning from Blue Jays owners Labatt and other interested parties before the Legislative Assembly of Ontario legalized beer sales in the middle of the 1982 season.

Bill Singer threw the first pitch in Toronto Blue Jays history to Ralph Garr of the White Sox, a high fastball called for a strike. From an 0–2 count, Garr battled back to 3–2, then drew a walk. Afterwards, Garr stole second base, advancing to third when catcher Rick Cerone's throw went into centre field. Shortstop Alan Bannister then hit a fly ball for the first out of the game. Jorge Orta followed with a sacrifice fly to cash in Garr, who scored the first run at Exhibition Stadium. Richie Zisk then hit the first home run at the Ex, making the score 2–0, White Sox. Blue Jays manager Roy Hartsfield went to the mound to talk to Singer as reliever Jerry Johnson started warming up in the bullpen. Singer was able to compose himself, getting Eric Soderholm to hit into a fielder's choice to end the inning.

Outfielder John Scott was the first Blue Jay to have an at bat. He faced White Sox pitcher Ken Brett, taking a strike on the first pitch thrown to him. He struck out, as did the next batter, Héctor Torres. Up came first baseman Doug Ault, a 27-year-old career minor-leaguer with only nine games' experience in the majors and the Jays' 16th pick in the expansion draft. On a 1–1 pitch, Ault slugged the first home run (and first hit) in Blue Jay history deep to left-centre. The score was now 2–1, Chicago.

The Chisox scored two runs in the top of the second, increasing their lead to 4-1. In the bottom of the second, Gary Woods bunted for a single, stole second, and scored on a single to right field by Pedro García. In the third inning, Torres singled and Ault was back at the plate. With the count 1–1, Ault hit his second home run down the right field line, and the game was tied at 4 runs apiece. Toronto took their first lead in the fourth when Dave McKay singled in García from second base.

Singer struck out Chet Lemon to start the fifth inning, but Brian Downing and Ralph Garr singled off him. Hartsfield came out to the mound to make a pitching change. Singer left to a standing ovation as Jerry Johnson entered the game. Johnson recorded the final two outs of the fifth. In his first major-league at bat, Al Woods pinch hit for Steve Bowling in the bottom of the fifth. With Otto Vélez at second base, Woods homered to right field. The score was now 7–4 in favour of Toronto, the team having scored in every inning to that point.

The Sox scored a run in the sixth inning, making the score 7–5. Pete Vuckovich entered in relief of Johnson to begin the eighth. He struck out two batters, gave up a walk and a single, but got a ground ball to end the inning. In the bottom of the inning, Ault returned to the plate and singled in another run to make the score 8–5. Another run scored on a double play ground out, making the score 9–5, Blue Jays.

In the top of the ninth, Vuckovich retired Jorge Orta on a ground ball. Vuckovich then struck out Richie Zisk. For the day, Zisk had four hits in five at bats. With one out to go for the win, Jim Spencer hit a line drive to left field but Scott dropped the ball for a two-base error. Oscar Gamble subsequently grounded out to the shortstop, and the Blue Jays had won their first game in franchise history. Jerry Johnson picked up the win while Vuckovich earned the save.

The heroes of opening day would not have a future with the Jays. Jerry Johnson retired after the '77 season and would end up in Hollywood working as a stuntman. At the 1977 Winter Meetings, Toronto traded Vuckovich to the St. Louis Cardinals in exchange for Tom Underwood. After seeing sporadic playing time in 1978, Doug Ault spent all of 1979 in the minors.

Linescore 
April 7, Exhibition Stadium, Toronto, Ontario

Boxscore

Batting

Pitching

April 
The Blue Jays finished their first homestand with a 5–2 record, sitting in first place in the American League East by 0.5 games, as the team took two of three against the Chicago White Sox and three of four from the Detroit Tigers. Pitcher Jerry Garvin picked up two of Toronto's five wins.

The Blue Jays struggled on their first road trip, as they were swept in a three-game series by the Chicago White Sox and split a four-game series with the New York Yankees, returning home with a 7–7 record.

On April 27, the Blue Jays were involved in their first extra innings game, defeating the Cleveland Indians 6–5 in 12 innings.

The Jays finished the month in fifth place with a 10–11 record, three games out of first place. Jerry Garvin had an impressive 4–0 record with a 2.14 ERA. Outfielder Otto Vélez hit .442 with five home runs and 18 RBI and was named American League Player of the Month.

May 
On May 4, the Blue Jays scored 10 runs in a game for the first time in team history, thumping the Milwaukee Brewers 10–3 at Exhibition Stadium. The team would score 10 runs again five nights later on May 9 in a 10–4 win over their expansion cousins, the Seattle Mariners.

On May 14, the Jays allowed double digits in runs for the first time, losing 13–3 to the Minnesota Twins.

Toronto struggled during the month of May, posting a record of 8–17. Following a 6–5 loss to the Oakland Athletics on May 25, the Blue Jays fell into last place in the American League East for the first time.

June 
After losing their first two games in June, the Blue Jays would win five of their next six, the only blemish being a 2–1 loss in 13 innings to the California Angels. Following that, Toronto would win only two of their next 14 games.

On June 27, Ron Guidry of the New York Yankees was carrying a no-hitter into the fifth inning when he walked the bases loaded, then gave up a grand slam to light-hitting Hector Torres, which vaulted the Jays to a 7–6 victory. During the month, Toronto had a 10–17 record, bringing their overall record to 28–45, seventh place in the American League East.

July 
The Blue Jays played their first Canada Day game on July 1, losing to the Texas Rangers 11–8 at Exhibition Stadium.

They went into the All-Star break with a 34–58 record, 19 games out of first place.  At the 1977 Major League Baseball All-Star Game held at Yankee Stadium in New York City on July 19, first baseman Ron Fairly was the only Blue Jays representative.  He struck out in his only at-bat against Tom Seaver.

After the All-Star break, the Blue Jays' struggles continued, losing eight games in a row before ending the month with a win over the Milwaukee Brewers. Toronto went 7–21 in July, bringing their overall record to 35–66; 24 games out of first place.

August 
On August 9, the Blue Jays defeated the Minnesota Twins 6–2 in front of 23,450 fans at Exhibition Stadium, as the franchise broke the single-season record for attendance by an expansion team. Despite that, August proved to be
another tough month for the club. Toronto went 10–18, bringing their record to 45–84 for the season, 32.5 games out of first place.  The Blue Jays lost their last five games in August.

September/October 
Toronto began September with six losses in a row, bringing their overall losing streak to 11 games, before defeating the Boston Red Sox 3–2 on September 7.

On September 10, Roy Howell drove in a club record nine runs in a 19–3 win over the New York Yankees at Yankee Stadium.  This marked the Yankees worst home loss in over 50 years.

At home on September 15, the Blue Jays earned a 9–0 forfeit victory over the Baltimore Orioles when, in the fifth inning, Orioles manager Earl Weaver removed his club from the field in a dispute over a tarp on the bullpen mounds. It marked the first (and still the only) time since 1914 that an MLB team has deliberately forfeited a game.

The Blue Jays inaugural season came to a close on October 2, as they split a doubleheader against the Cleveland Indians in front of 27,789 fans at Exhibition Stadium, bringing their total attendance to 1,701,052, an MLB record for an expansion team.

Toronto finished the year in last place in the American League East with a 54–107 record, 45.5 games behind the first place New York Yankees. The Blue Jays also finished 9.5 games worse than their expansion cousins, the Seattle Mariners, who went 64–98. The Blue Jays attained success far sooner than the Mariners; Toronto's first winning season took place in 1983, while Seattle failed to post a winning season until 1991.

Season standings

Record vs. opponents

Notable transactions 
 April 14, 1977: Canadian-born Paul Hodgson was signed as an amateur free agent by the Blue Jays.
 May 9, 1977: Steve Hargan and Jim Mason were traded by the Blue Jays to the Texas Rangers for Roy Howell.
 June 7, 1977: Future NBA player Danny Ainge was drafted by the Blue Jays in the 15th round of the 1977 Major League Baseball draft.

Roster

Game log 

|- align="center" bgcolor="bbffbb"
|  1 || April 7 ||  White Sox || 9–5 || Johnson (1–0) || Brett (0–1) || Vuckovic (1) || 44,649 || 1–0 
|- align="center" bgcolor="ffbbbb"
|  2 || April 9 ||  White Sox || 3–2 || Knapp (1–0) || Lemanczyk  (0–1) || LaGrow (1) || 18,214 || 1–1
|- align="center" bgcolor="bbffbb"
|  3 || April 10 ||  White Sox || 3–1 || Garvin (1–0) || Stone (0–1) ||  Vuckovic (2) || 17,059 || 2–1 
|- align="center" bgcolor="bbffbb"
|  4 || April 11 ||  Tigers || 5–3 || Hargan (1–0) || Hiller (0–1) ||  || 29,132 || 3–1 
|- align="center" bgcolor="ffbbbb"
|  5 || April 12 ||  Tigers || 6–1 || Roberts (1–1) || Singer (0–1) || || 11,505 
|| 3–2
|- align="center" bgcolor="bbffbb"
|  6 || April 13 ||  Tigers || 7–6 || Lemanczyk (1–1) || Arroyo (0–1) || Willis (1) || 12,113 || 4–2 
|- align="center" bgcolor="bbffbb"
|  7 || April 14 ||  Tigers || 5–3 || Garvin (2–0) || Hiller (0–2) ||  || 13,369 || 5–2 
|- align="center" bgcolor="ffbbbb"
|  8 || April 15 ||  @ White Sox || 7–5 || Barrios (1–0) || Johnson  (1–1) || || 10,840 || 5–3
|- align="center" bgcolor="ffbbbb"
|  9 || April 16 ||  @ White Sox || 3–2 || Stone (1–1) || Vuckovic (0–1) || ||  7,467 || 5–4 
|- align="center" bgcolor="ffbbbb"
| 10 || April 17 ||  @ White Sox || 4–2 || Brett (2–1) || Singer (0–2) ||  Del Canton (1) || 14,583 || 5–5 
|- align="center" bgcolor="bbffbb"
| 11 || April 18 ||  @ Yankees || 5–1 || Lemanczyk (2–1) || Figueroa (0–2) || ||  9,685 || 6–5 
|- align="center" bgcolor="bbffbb"
| 12 || April 19 ||  @ Yankees || 8–3 || Garvin (3–0) || Patterson (0–1) || || 9,954 || 7–5 
|- align="center" bgcolor="ffbbbb"
| 13 || April 20 ||  @ Yankees || 7–5 || Gullett (1–2) || Hargan (1–1) || Lyle (2) || 10,819 || 7–6
|- align="center" bgcolor="ffbbbb"
| 14 || April 21 ||  @ Yankees || 8–6 || Holtzman (1–0) || Hartenstein  (0–1) ||  Lyle (3) ||10,502 || 7–7
|- align="center" bgcolor="bbbbbb"
| – || April 22 || Red Sox || colspan=6|Postponed (rain) Rescheduled for April 25
|- align="center" bgcolor="bbbbbb"
| – || April 23 || Red Sox || colspan=6|Postponed (rain) Rescheduled for September 5
|- align="center" bgcolor="ffbbbb"
| 15 || April 24 ||  Red Sox || 9–0 || Jenkins (2–1) || Singer (0–3) || ||  29,303 || 7–8 
|- align="center" bgcolor="bbffbb"
| 16 || April 25 ||  Red Sox || 4–3 || Vuckovich (1–1) || Campbell (0–3) || || || 8–8 
|- align="center" bgcolor="ffbbbb"
| 17 || April 25 ||  Red Sox || 6–5 || Willoughby (1–0) || Vuckovic (1–2) || ||  15,016 || 8–9
|- align="center" bgcolor="bbbbbb"
| – || April 26 || @ Indians || colspan=6|Postponed (rain) Rescheduled for April 28
|- align="center" bgcolor="bbffbb"
| 18 || April 27 ||  @ Indians || 6–5 (12)  || Willis (1–0) || Kern (0–1) ||  ||  3,639 ||  9–9
|- align="center" bgcolor="ffbbbb"
| 19 || April 28 ||  @ Indians || 4–3 || Fitzmorris (1–2) || Jefferson (0–1) || Waits (1) || 2,724 || 9–10
|- align="center" bgcolor="ffbbbb"
| 20 || April 29 ||  @ Royals || 6–1 || Colborn (4–1) || Singer (0–4) || || 15,523 || 9–11 
|- align="center" bgcolor="bbffbb"
| 21 || April 30 ||  @ Royals || 2–1 || Garvin (4–0) || Splittorff (1–2) || || 15,301 || 10–11
|-

|- align="center" bgcolor="ffbbbb"
| 22 || May 1 ||  @ Royals || 8–2 || Gura (2–0) || Lemanczyk (2–2) || Littell (3) || 34,066 || 10–12
|- align="center" bgcolor="ffbbbb"
| 23 || May 2 ||  Brewers || 3–1 || Haas (1–1) || Hargan (1–2) || Castro (5) || 17,577 || 10–13 
|- align="center" bgcolor="ffbbbb"
| 24 || May 3 ||  Brewers || 6–2 || Cort (1–0) || Jefferson (0–2) || || 13,148 || 10–14
|- align="center" bgcolor="bbffbb"
| 25 || May 4 ||  Brewers || 10–3 || Singer (1–4) || Slaton (1–2) || Willis (2) || 25,699 || 11–14 
|- align="center" bgcolor="bbffbb"
| 26 || May 5 ||  Brewers || 9–8 || Vuckovic (2–2) || Castro (3–1) || || 12,268 || 12–14
|- align="center" bgcolor="ffbbbb"
| 27 || May 6 ||  Twins || 7–2 || Zahn (5–0) || Lemanczyk (2–3) || Schueler (1) || 26,355 || 12–15
|- align="center" bgcolor="ffbbbb"
| 28 || May 7 ||  Twins || 4–1 || Thormodsgard (2–1) || Hargan (1–3) || Johnson (4) ||  34,091 || 12–16
|- align="center" bgcolor="ffbbbb"
| 29 || May 8 ||  Twins || 5–4 || Goltz (1–2) || Jefferson (0–3) || Johnson (5) || 20,902 || 12–17 
|- align="center" bgcolor="bbffbb"
| 30 || May 9 ||  Mariners || 10–4 || Singer (2–4) || Thomas (1–4) || || 11,680 || 13–17 
|- align="center" bgcolor="bbffbb"
| 31 || May 10 ||  Mariners || 9–3 || Garvin (5–0) || Montague (3–3) || || 13,017 || 14–17 
|- align="center" bgcolor="ffbbbb"
| 32 || May 13 ||  @ Twins || 4–3 (11) || Schueler (2–1) || Willis (1–1) || || 9,667 || 14–18
|- align="center" bgcolor="ffbbbb"
| 33 || May 14 ||  @ Twins || 13–3 || Goltz (2–2) || Singer (2–5) || || 10,503 || 14–19 
|- align="center" bgcolor="ffbbbb"
| 34 || May 15 ||  @ Twins || 5–3 || Burgmeier (4–1) || Garvin (5–1) || Schueler (2) || 11,401 || 14–20 
|- align="center" bgcolor="bbffbb"
| 35 || May 17 ||  @ Brewers || 3–1 || Jefferson (1–3) || Haas (3–2) || Johnson (1) || 6,810 || 15–20 
|- align="center" bgcolor="ffbbbb"
| 36 || May 18 ||  @ Brewers || 3–2 (10) || Castro (4–1) || Vuckovic (2–3) || || 7,208 || 15–21
|- align="center" bgcolor="ffbbbb"
| 37 || May 19 ||  @ Brewers || 5–3 || Slaton (2–4) || Singer (2–6) || McClure (3) || 8,469 || 15–22 
|- align="center" bgcolor="bbffbb"
| 38 || May 20 ||  @ Rangers || 4–3 || Garvin (6–1) || Blyleven (4–4) || || 21,965 || 16–22 
|- align="center" bgcolor="bbffbb"
| 39 || May 21 ||  @ Rangers || 9–6 || Jefferson (2–3) || Briles (2–1) || Willis (3) || 20,351 || 17–22 
|- align="center" bgcolor="ffbbbb"
| 40 || May 22 ||  @ Rangers || 7–4 || Alexander (6–1) || Lemanczyk (2–4) || Knowles (2) || 21,831 || 17–23
|- align="center" bgcolor="ffbbbb"
| 41 || May 23 ||  Athletics || 3–0 || Langford (4–3) || Vuckovic (2–4) || || 27,705 || 17–24 
|- align="center" bgcolor="ffbbbb"
| 42 || May 25 ||  Athletics || 6–5 (10) || Giusti (1–2) || Garvin (6–2) || || 36,097 || 17–25 
|- align="center" bgcolor="ffbbbb"
| 43 || May 27 ||  Angels || 4–1 || Ross (2–2) || Johnson (1–2) || Hartzell (4) || 24,779 || 17–26 
|- align="center" bgcolor="bbffbb"
| 44 || May 28 ||  Angels || 6–4 || Jefferson (3–3) || Simpson (3–4) || Vuckovic (3) ||30,034 || 18–26 
|- align="center" bgcolor="ffbbbb"
| 45 || May 29 ||  Angels || 3–2 || Ryan (8–4) || Lemanczyk (2–5) || || 30,009 || 18–27
|- align="center" bgcolor="ffbbbb"
| 46 || May 30 ||  Royals || 4–1 || Splittorff (4–4) || Garvin (6–3) || Littell (6) || 20,002 || 18–28
|-

|- align="center" bgcolor="ffbbbb"
| 47 || June 1 ||  Royals || 11–3 || Leonard (3–5) || Singer (2–7) || || 33,004 || 18–29 
|- align="center" bgcolor="ffbbbb"
| 48 || June 3 ||  @ Athletics || 3–2 || Lacey (2–2) || Jefferson (3–4) || || 3,030 || 18–30 
|- align="center" bgcolor="bbffbb"
| 49 || June 4 ||  @ Athletics || 4–2 || Lemanczyk (3–5) || Ellis (2–5) || Vuckovic (4) || 4,525 || 19–30 
|- align="center" bgcolor="bbffbb"
| 50 || June 5 ||  @ Athletics || 7–3 || Garvin (7–3) || Blue (3–7) || Johnson (2) || 4,580 || 20–30 
|- align="center" bgcolor="bbffbb"
| 51 || June 7 ||  @ Angels || 6–3 || Willis (2–1) || Hartzell (1–5) || || 10,239 || 21–30 
|- align="center" bgcolor="ffbbbb"
| 52 || June 8 ||  @ Angels || 2–1 (13) || LaRoche (4–2) ||  Bruno (0–1) || || 11,678 || 21–31
|- align="center" bgcolor="bbffbb"
| 53 || June 10 ||  @ Mariners || 4–3 || Lemanczyk (4–5) || Montague (5–4) || Willis (4) || 11,786 || 22–31 
|- align="center" bgcolor="bbffbb"
| 54 || June 11 ||  @ Mariners || 5–4 || Johnson (2–2) || Romo (3–4) || || 21,318 || 23–31 
|- align="center" bgcolor="ffbbbb"
| 55 || June 12 ||  @ Mariners || 5–2 || Pole (3–2) || Vuckovic (2–5) || || 28,412 || 23–32
|- align="center" bgcolor="ffbbbb"
| 56 || June 14 ||  @ Tigers || 7–2 || Hiller (4–6) || Jefferson (3–5) || || 11,808 || 23–33 
|- align="center" bgcolor="ffbbbb"
| 57 || June 15 ||  @ Tigers || 9–0 || Arroyo (5–3) || Lemanczyk (4–6) || || 11,349 || 23–34 
|- align="center" bgcolor="ffbbbb"
| 58 || June 16 ||  @ Tigers || 4–1 || Fidrych (3–2) || Garvin (7–4) || || 26,041 || 23–35 
|- align="center" bgcolor="ffbbbb"
| 59 || June 17 ||  Orioles || 5–3 || Martínez (6–4) || Vuckovic (2–6) || || 26,183 || 23–36 
|- align="center" bgcolor="ffbbbb"
| 60 || June 18 ||  Orioles || 4–2 || Palmer (8–6) || Jefferson (3–6) || Martinez (2) || 33,201 || 23–37 
|- align="center" bgcolor="bbffbb"
| 61 || June 19 ||  Orioles || 7–1 || Lemanczyk (5–6) || Flanagan (2–7) || || 34,556 || 24–37 
|- align="center" bgcolor="ffbbbb"
| 62 || June 20 ||  Indians || 8–5 (11) || Dobson (2–6) || Willis (2–2) || Kern (8) || 24,568 || 24–38
|- align="center" bgcolor="ffbbbb"
| 63 || June 21 ||  Indians || 4–0 || Waits (4–0) || Garvin (7–5) || Kern (9) || 18,039 || 24–39 
|- align="center" bgcolor="ffbbbb"
| 64 || June 22 ||  Indians || 7–5 (12) || Kern (3–3) || Johnson (2–3) || Monge (4) || 29,750 || 24–40 
|- align="center" bgcolor="ffbbbb"
| 65 || June 23 ||  Indians || 4–0 || Garland (4–7) || Jefferson (3–7) || || 16,747 || 24–41 
|- align="center" bgcolor="bbffbb"
| 66 || June 24 ||  @ Orioles || 5–4 || Lemanczyk (6–6) || Holdsworth (0–1) || Willis (5) || 8,133 || 25–41 
|- align="center" bgcolor="ffbbbb"
| 67 || June 25 ||  @ Orioles || 5–2 || Martínez (7–5) || Byrd (0–1) || || 16,794 || 25–42
|- align="center" bgcolor="ffbbbb"
| 68 || June 25 ||  @ Orioles || 3–1 || Grimsley (7–3) || Garvin (7–6) || || 16,794 || 25–43 
|- align="center" bgcolor="bbffbb"
| 69 || June 26 ||  @ Orioles || 2–0 || Vuckovic (3–6) || Palmer (8–8) || || 16,761 || 26–43 
|- align="center" bgcolor="bbffbb"
| 70 || June 27 ||  Yankees || 7–6 || Jefferson (4–7) || Guidry (5–4) || Johnson (3) || 29,138 || 27–43 
|- align="center" bgcolor="bbffbb"
| 71 || June 28 ||  Yankees || 8–5 || Lemanczyk (7–6) || Clay (0–2) || || 40,116 || 28–43 
|- align="center" bgcolor="ffbbbb"
| 72 || June 28 ||  Yankees || 5–1 (11) || Tidrow (6–2) ||  Johnson (2–4) || || 40,116 || 28–44
|- align="center" bgcolor="ffbbbb"
| 73 || June 30 ||  Yankees || 11–5 || Hunter (4–3) || Garvin (7–7) || || 33,283 || 28–45 
|-

|- align="center" bgcolor="ffbbbb"
| 74 || July 1 ||  Rangers || 11–8 || Alexander (7–5) || Byrd (0–2) || Devine (4) || 21,089 || 28–46 
|- align="center" bgcolor="bbffbb"
| 75 || July 2 ||  Rangers || 10–7 || Vuckovic (4–6) || Barker (0–1) || || 19,176 || 29–46 
|- align="center" bgcolor="ffbbbb"
| 76 || July 3 ||  Rangers || 6–3 (10) || Ellis (4–7) || Willis (2–3) || Knowles (3) || || 29–47
|- align="center" bgcolor="bbffbb"
| 77 || July 3 ||  Rangers || 5–3 || Jefferson (5–7) || Knowles (2–1) || || 32,066 || 30–47 
|- align="center" bgcolor="ffbbbb"
| 78 || July 4 ||  @ Red Sox || 9–6 || Campbell (6–5) || Hartenstein (0–2) || || 21,073 || 30–48
|- align="center" bgcolor="ffbbbb"
| 79 || July 6 ||  @ Red Sox || 9–5 || Campbell (7–5) || Vuckovic (4–7) || || 34,956 || 30–49 
|- align="center" bgcolor="ffbbbb"
| 80 || July 7 ||  @ Red Sox || 5–2 || Stanley (5–3) || Jefferson (5–8) || Campbell (16) || 32,641 || 30–50 
|- align="center" bgcolor="ffbbbb"
| 81 || July 8 ||  @ Indians || 11–5 || Eckersley (8–7) || Lemanczyk (7–7) || || 12,719 || 30–51 
|- align="center" bgcolor="ffbbbb"
| 82 || July 9 ||  @ Indians || 3–2 || Garland (6–9) || Garvin (7–8) || || 19,594 || 30–52 
|- align="center" bgcolor="bbffbb"
| 83 || July 10 ||  @ Indians || 5–3 || Byrd (1–2) || Dobson (3–8) || Vuckovic (5) || 12,935 || 31–52 
|- align="center" bgcolor="ffbbbb"
| 84 || July 11 ||  @ Tigers || 9–7 || Grilli (1–0) || DeBarr (0–1) || || 9,057 || 31–53
|- align="center" bgcolor="ffbbbb"
| 85 || July 12 ||  @ Tigers || 2–1 || Crawford (3–2) || Jefferson (5–9) || || 25,007 || 31–54 
|- align="center" bgcolor="ffbbbb"
| 86 || July 13 ||  @ White Sox || 6–3 || Knapp (8–4) || Singer (2–8) || Johnson (2) || || 31–55           
|- align="center" bgcolor="bbffbb"
| 87 || July 13 ||  @ White Sox || 5–3 (11) || Lemanczyk (8–7) || Kucek (0–1) || || 25,669 || 32–55
|- align="center" bgcolor="ffbbbb"
| 88 || July 14 ||  @ White Sox || 2–1 || Kravec (6–2) || Garvin (7–9) || || 15,937 || 32–56
|- align="center" bgcolor="bbffbb"
| 89 || July 15 ||  Tigers || 8–6 (13) || Vuckovic (5–7) ||  Crawford (3–3) || || 23,749 || 33–56
|- align="center" bgcolor="ffbbbb"
| 90 || July 16 ||  Tigers || 11–3 || Rozema (8–4) || Willis (2–4) || || 35,151 || 33–57
|- align="center" bgcolor="bbffbb"
| 91 || July 17 ||  Tigers || 3–2 || Jefferson (6–9) || Arroyo (5–9) || || || 34–57
|- align="center" bgcolor="ffbbbb"
| 92 || July 17 ||  Tigers || 7–6 (11) || Hiller (5–9) || Lemanczyk (8–8) || || 36,613 || 34–58
|- align="center" bgcolor="ffbbbb"
| 93 || July 22 ||  White Sox || 10–3 || Wood (5–2) || Garvin (7–10) || LaGrow (17) || 33,175 || 34–59 
|- align="center" bgcolor="ffbbbb"
| 94 || July 23 ||  White Sox || 10–3 || Kravec (7–2) || Lemanczyk (8–9) || || 24,263 || 34–60 
|- align="center" bgcolor="ffbbbb"
| 95 || July 24 ||  @ Tigers || 6–2 || Sykes (2–3) || Jefferson (6–10) || || 20,177 || 34–61 
|- align="center" bgcolor="ffbbbb"
| 96 || July 25 ||  @ Tigers || 8–3 || Wilcox (2–0) || Byrd (1–3) || Crawford (1) || 16,911 || 34–62 
|- align="center" bgcolor="ffbbbb"
| 97 || July 26 ||  Rangers || 14–0 || Blyleven (10–9) || Clancy (0–1) || || 22,357 || 34–63 
|- align="center" bgcolor="ffbbbb"
| 98 || July 28 ||  Rangers || 3–0 || Perry (9–8) || Garvin (7–11) || || 17,512 || 34–64
|- align="center" bgcolor="ffbbbb"
| 99 || July 29 ||  Brewers || 7–3 || Haas (7–7) || Jefferson (6–11) || || 14,303 || 34–65 
|- align="center" bgcolor="ffbbbb"
|100 || July 30 ||  Brewers || 3–2 || Slaton (8–9) || Byrd (1–4) || || 18,639 || 34–66 
|- align="center" bgcolor="bbffbb"
|101 || July 31 ||  Brewers || 4–1 || Lemanczyk (9–9) || Augustine (10–12) || Murphy (1) || 28,110 || 35–66 
|-

|- align="center" bgcolor="bbffbb"
|102 || August 1 ||  Brewers || 3–2 || Clancy (1–1) || Sorensen (2–5) || || 17,590 || 36–66 
|- align="center" bgcolor="ffbbbb"
|103 || August 3 ||  @ Royals || 7–4 || Splittorff (9–5) || Garvin (7–12) || Bird (1) || 16,775 || 36–67
|- align="center" bgcolor="ffbbbb"
|104 || August 4 ||  @ Royals || 8–0 || Gura (6–5) || Jefferson (6–12) || || 17,661 || 36–68 
|- align="center" bgcolor="bbffbb"
|105 || August 5 ||  @ Brewers || 6–1 || Byrd (2–4) || Slaton (8–10) || || 13,609 || 37–68 
|- align="center" bgcolor="bbffbb"
|106 || August 6 ||  @ Brewers || 5–3 || Lemanczyk (10–9) || Augustine (10–13) || Johnson (4) || 12,720 || 38–68 
|- align="center" bgcolor="ffbbbb"
|107 || August 7 ||  @ Brewers || 6–2 || Sorensen (3–5) || Garvin (7–13) || McClure (4) || || 38–69
|- align="center" bgcolor="ffbbbb"
|108 || August 7 ||  @ Brewers || 7–5 || Haas (8–7) || Clancy (1–2) || Hinds (2) || 12,070 || 38–70
|- align="center" bgcolor="bbffbb"
|109 || August 9 ||  Twins || 6–2 || Jefferson (7–12) || Thormodsgard (9–9) || || 23,450 || 39–70 
|- align="center" bgcolor="ffbbbb"
|110 || August 11 ||  Twins || 7–3 || Goltz (15–6) || Byrd (2–5) || Johnson (14) || 18,430 || 39–71
|- align="center" bgcolor="ffbbbb"
|111 || August 12 ||  Royals || 9–8 || Pattin (5–2) || Lemanczyk (10–10) || Bird (3) || 19,143 || 39–72 
|- align="center" bgcolor="ffbbbb"
|112 || August 13 ||  Royals || 5–3 || Splittorff (10–6) || Clancy (1–3) || Bird (4) || 25,027 || 39–73
|- align="center" bgcolor="bbffbb"
|113 || August 14 ||  Royals || 6–3 || Murphy (1–1) || Leonard (12–10) || Vuckovic (6) || 27,430 || 40–73 
|- align="center" bgcolor="ffbbbb"
|114 || August 15 ||  Angels || 7–4 || Tanana (14–7) || Jefferson (7–13) || || 18,453 || 40–74
|- align="center" bgcolor="ffbbbb"
|115 || August 16 ||  Angels || 7–2 || Hartzell (6–7) || Byrd (2–6) || || 15,424 || 40–75 
|- align="center" bgcolor="ffbbbb"
|116 || August 17 ||  @ Rangers || 6–5 (10) || Devine (9–6)  || Willis (2–5) || || 12,913 || 40–76
|- align="center" bgcolor="ffbbbb"
|117 || August 18 ||  @ Rangers || 8–0 || Ellis (7–9) || Clancy (1–4) || || 15,740 || 40–77 
|- align="center" bgcolor="bbffbb"
|118 || August 19 ||  @ Angels || 3–1 || Garvin (8–13) || Ryan (17–11) || Vuckovic (7) || 16,570 || 41–77 
|- align="center" bgcolor="bbffbb"
|119 || August 20 ||  @ Angels || 5–4 || Vuckovic  (6–7) || LaRoche (7–5) || || 15,311 || 42–77
|- align="center" bgcolor="ffbbbb"
|120 || August 21 ||  @ Angels || 3–2 || Tanana (15–7) || Byrd (2–7) || || 12,421 || 42–78
|- align="center" bgcolor="ffbbbb"
|121 || August 22 ||  @ Athletics || 5–2 || Medich (6–6) || Lemanczyk (10–11) || Lacey (7) || 4,429 || 42–79 
|- align="center" bgcolor="bbffbb"
|122 || August 23 ||  @ Athletics || 8–1 || Clancy (2–4) || Umbarger (1–5) || || 3,797 || 43–79 
|- align="center" bgcolor="bbffbb"
|123 || August 24 ||  @ Mariners || 7–0 || Garvin (9–13) || Pole (7–11) || || || 44–79
|- align="center" bgcolor="bbffbb"
|124 || August 24 ||  @ Mariners || 9–3 || Jefferson (8–13) || Abbott (10–9) || || 13,253 || 45–79 
|- align="center" bgcolor="ffbbbb"
|125 || August 26 ||  Athletics || 8–4 || Torrealba (4–4) || Byrd (2–8) || || 22,536 || 45–80
|- align="center" bgcolor="ffbbbb"
|126 || August 27 ||  Athletics || 9–8 || Medich (7–6) || Lemanczyk (10–12) || Bair (2) || 23,651 || 45–81 
|- align="center" bgcolor="ffbbbb"
|127 || August 28 ||  Athletics || 6–2 || Blue (13–15) || Clancy (2–5) || || 24,087 || 45–82 
|- align="center" bgcolor="ffbbbb"
|128 || August 29 ||  @ Twins || 7–6 (10) || Schueler (7–6) ||  Murphy (1–2)  || || || 45–83
|- align="center" bgcolor="ffbbbb"
|129 || August 29 ||  @ Twins || 6–5 || Johnson (15–6) || Willis (2–6) || || 10,364 || 45–84 
|-

|- align="center" bgcolor="ffbbbb"
|130 || September 2 ||  Mariners || 4–3 || Abbott (11–10) || Lemanczyk (10–13) || || 13,502 || 45–85 
|- align="center" bgcolor="ffbbbb"
|131 || September 3 ||  Mariners || 6–2 || Montague (7–10) || Jefferson (8–14) || Romo (12) || 15,109 || 45–86
|- align="center" bgcolor="ffbbbb"
|132 || September 4 ||  Mariners || 7–2 || Mitchell (2–5) || Garvin (9–14) || || 17,084 || 45–87 
|- align="center" bgcolor="ffbbbb"
|133 || September 5 ||  Red Sox || 8–0 || Aase (4–1) || Byrd (2–9) || || || 45–88
|- align="center" bgcolor="ffbbbb"
|134 || September 5 ||  Red Sox || 6–0 || Cleveland (9–7) || Clancy (2–6) || || 30,373 || 45–89 
|- align="center" bgcolor="ffbbbb"
|135 || September 6 ||  Red Sox || 11–2 || Lee (7–3) || Darr (0–1) || || 17,666 || 45–90 
|- align="center" bgcolor="bbffbb"
|136 || September 7 ||  Red Sox || 3–2 || Lemanczyk (11–13) || Jenkins (10–10) || || 31,684 || 46–90 
|- align="center" bgcolor="ffbbbb"
|137 || September 8 ||  Red Sox || 7–2 || Paxton (9–4) || Jefferson (8–15) || || 19,163 || 46–91
|- align="center" bgcolor="ffbbbb"
|138 || September 9 ||  @ Yankees || 2–0 || Torrez (16–12) || Garvin (9–15) || || 21,145 || 46–92 
|- align="center" bgcolor="bbffbb"
|139 || September 10 ||  @ Yankees || 19–3 || Clancy (3–6) || Hunter (9–9) || || 20,296 || 47–92 
|- align="center" bgcolor="ffbbbb"
|140 || September 11 ||  @ Yankees || 4–3 || Tidrow (10–4) || Byrd (2–10) || Lyle (23) || 40,905 || 47–93
|- align="center" bgcolor="bbffbb"
|141 || September 11 ||  @ Yankees || 6–4 || Murphy (2–2) || Gullett (11–4) || Johnson (5) || 40,905 || 48–93 
|- align="center" bgcolor="ffbbbb"
|142 || September 12 ||  Orioles || 6–3 || Palmer (16–11) || Lemanczyk (11–14) || Martinez (8) || 13,498 || 48–94
|- align="center" bgcolor="ffbbbb"
|143 || September 14 ||  Orioles || 6–5 || Flanagan (12–10) || Jefferson (8–16) || McGregor (3) || 19,048 || 48–95 
|- align="center" bgcolor="ffbbbb"
|144 || September 14 ||  Orioles || 4–2 ||  May (17–12) || Garvin (9–16) || McGregor (4) || 19,048 || 48–96
|- align="center" bgcolor="bbffbb"
|145 || September 15 ||  Orioles || 4–0 (5) † || Clancy (4–6) || Grimsley (13–9) || || 14,015 ||  49–96
|- align="center" bgcolor="bbbbbb"
| – || September 16 || @ Indians || colspan=6|Postponed (rain) Rescheduled for September 17
|- align="center" bgcolor="ffbbbb"
|146 || September 17 ||  @ Indians || 6–3 || Eckersley (14–12) || Byrd (2–11) || Dobson (1) |||| 49–97
|- align="center" bgcolor="bbffbb"
|147 || September 17 ||  @ Indians || 6–5 || Lemanczyk (12–14) || Waits (8–6) || Murphy (2) || 5,593 || 50–97
|- align="center" bgcolor="bbffbb"
|148 || September 18 ||  @ Indians || 7–4 || Jefferson (9–16) || Garland (11–19) || Vuckovic (8) || 4,376 || 51–97 
|- align="center" bgcolor="bbffbb"
|149 || September 19 ||  @ Orioles || 3–1 || Garvin (10–16) || May (17–13) || || 3,325 || 52–97
|- align="center" bgcolor="ffbbbb"
|150 || September 20 ||  @ Orioles || 5–2 || Palmer (18–11) || Clancy (4–7) || || 4,301 || 52–98
|- align="center" bgcolor="ffbbbb"
|151 || September 21 ||  @ Orioles || 4–0 || Grimsley (14–9) || Byrd (2–12) || || 4,237 || 52–99 
|- align="center" bgcolor="ffbbbb"
|152 || September 22 ||  @ Orioles || 7–1 || Flanagan (13–10) || Lemanczyk (12–15) || || 9,261 || 52–100 
|- align="center" bgcolor="ffbbbb"
|153 || September 23 ||  Yankees || 5–3 || Gullett (13–4) || Jefferson (9–17) || || 32,590 || 52–101
|- align="center" bgcolor="bbbbbb"
| – || September 24 || Yankees || colspan=6|Postponed (rain) Rescheduled for September 25
|- align="center" bgcolor="ffbbbb"
|154 || September 25 ||  Yankees || 15–0 || Guidry (16–6) || Garvin (10–17) || || 35,117 || 52–102 
|- align="center" bgcolor="ffbbbb"
|155 || September 25 ||  Yankees || 2–0 || Figueroa (16–10) || Clancy (4–8) || Lyle (25) || 35,117 || 52–103
|- align="center" bgcolor="bbbbbb"
| – || September 26 || @ Red Sox || colspan=6|Postponed (rain) Rescheduled for September 27
|- align="center" bgcolor="ffbbbb"
|156 || September 27 ||  @ Red Sox || 6–5 || Aase (6–2) || Byrd (2–13) || Campbell (30) || || 52–104
|- align="center" bgcolor="ffbbbb"
|157 || September 27 ||  @ Red Sox || 5–1 || Tiant (12–8) || Lemanczyk (12–16) || Campbell (31) || 23,952 || 52–105 
|- align="center" bgcolor="bbffbb"
|158 || September 28 ||  @ Red Sox || 3–2 || Vuckovic (7–7) || Lee (9–5) || || 20,362 || 53–105 
|- align="center" bgcolor="ffbbbb"
|159 || September 29 ||  @ Red Sox || 7–3 || Stanley (8–7) || Garvin (10–18) || || 12,240 || 53–106
|- align="center" bgcolor="bbbbbb"
| – || September 30 || Indians || colspan=6|Postponed (rain) Rescheduled for October 1
|-

|- align="center" bgcolor="bbbbbb"
| – || October 1 || Indians || colspan=6|Postponed (rain) Rescheduled for October 2
|- align="center" bgcolor="bbbbbb"
| – || October 1 || Indians || colspan=6|Postponed (rain) Not rescheduled
|- align="center" bgcolor="bbffbb"
|160 || October 2 ||  Indians || 2–1 (11) || Lemanczyk (13–16) || Andersen (0–1) || || || 54–106
|- align="center" bgcolor="ffbbbb"
|161 || October 2 ||  Indians || 5–4 || Camper (1–0) || Clancy (4–9) || Waits (2) || 27,789 || 54–107
|-

| † Game forfeited by Baltimore.

Player stats

Batting

Starters by position 
Note: Pos = Position; G = Games played; AB = At bats; R = Runs scored; H = Hits; 2B = Doubles; 3B = Triples; Avg = Batting average; HR = Home runs; RBI = Runs batted in; SB = Stolen bases

Other batters 
Note: G = Games played; AB = At bats; R = Runs scored; H = Hits; 2B = Doubles; 3B = Triples; Avg = Batting average; HR = Home runs; RBI = Runs batted in; SB = Stolen bases

Pitching

Starting pitchers 
Note: G = Games pitched; GS = Games started; IP = Innings pitched; W = Wins; L = Losses; ERA = Earned run average; R = Runs allowed; ER = Earned runs allowed; BB = Walks allowed; K = Strikeouts

Relief pitchers 
Note: G = Games pitched; IP = Innings pitched; W = Wins; L = Losses; SV = Saves; ERA = Earned run average; R = Runs allowed; ER = Earned runs allowed; BB = Walks allowed; K = Strikeouts

Awards and honors 
Otto Vélez, OF-DH, Player of the Month Award, April

All-Star Game
Ron Fairly, first base, reserve

Franchise firsts 
April 7, 1977:
Game & Win: Toronto 9, Chicago (White Sox) 5 (at Exhibition Stadium)
Batter: John Scott
Pitcher: Bill Singer
Hit: Doug Ault
Home Run: Doug Ault
Stolen Base: Gary Woods
Save: Pete Vuckovich
Grand Slam: June 27, 1977, Héctor Torres vs. New York (AL)
Walk-off Win: July 15, 1977, Toronto 8, Detroit 6 (13 innings)

Farm system

Notes

References 
1977 Toronto Blue Jays at Baseball Reference
1977 Toronto Blue Jays at Baseball Almanac

Toronto Blue Jays seasons
Toronto Blue Jays season
Inaugural Major League Baseball seasons by team
1977 in Canadian sports
1977 in Toronto